Amy Alexander is an artist and researcher working in audio/visual performance, interactive art and software art, under a number of pseudonyms including VJ Übergeek and Cue P. Doll.  She is a professor at the Department of Visual Arts at the University of California, San Diego.

Biography 

Amy Alexander is active across the digital arts, playing a leading role in shaping the domains of software art and live coding. Her works have been exhibited and performed at museums, festivals, and conferences including the Whitney Museum, Transmediale, Ars Electronica, and SIGGRAPH. She has also performed in non-art venues including nightclubs and street performances.

Alexander's first widely exhibited new media work was the net art project, The Multi-Cultural Recycler (1996/7), which was nominated for a Webby Award in 1999. She then developed the plagiarist.org website, which was known for its humorous projects related to Internet culture. Her more recent work has been in video installation and visual performance, most notably SVEN, Discotrope: The Secret Nightlife of Solar Cells with Annina Ruest and CyberSpaceLand. She has also written texts on historical and contemporary audiovisual performance, including a chapter in the See This Sound compendium.

Education 

Alexander attended Rowan University from 19881991 and received her BA in Communications: Radio/TV/Film. She was also actively involved in the Cinema Workshop club and Rowan Radio 89.7 WGLS-FM. She then attended the California Institute of the Arts from 1993–1996, and received her MFA in Film/Video and New Media.

Career 

Alexander developed a background in programming, music, and visual media at her alma maters. She taught at the California Institute of the Arts and the University of Southern California. She also worked in television, animation, information technology and new media.

Amy Alexander is currently Professor of Visual Arts: Computing at the University of California, San Diego. Her teaching focuses on contemporary expanded cinema, visual performance, abstract cinema history, and process-based digital media art.

References

External links 

 
 Pau Alsina interviews Amy Alexander
 Academic profile

American digital artists
Women digital artists
American performance artists
Living people
Net.artists
Year of birth missing (living people)
21st-century American women artists